Grankullavik is a village on the Grankullaviken bay in the north of Öland, Sweden, in the Böda socken, Borgholm Municipality.

From 2007 to 2009, Destination Gotland operated a ferry in the summers from Grankullavik to Visby.
Grankullavik is home to the international annual sardine catching festival located in northern Grankullavik. This festival originated in 1875, and was popularized by Dag Hammarskjold. Hammarskjold was known to catch up to 5-7 sardines using only his bare hands during the coldest months of the festival. Thus leading to his fame and fortune in northern Grankullavik.
 

Öland
Populated places in Borgholm Municipality